The following radio stations broadcast on FM frequency 98.4 MHz:

Bangladesh
 Radio Ekattor in Dhaka

Isle of Man
 Energy FM in Ramsey

Indonesia
 Prambors FM in Bandung, West Java
 RRI Pro 2 in Ambon, Maluku Province
 Radio Swara Giri FM in Surabaya, East Java
 MG Radio in Makassar, South Sulawesi
 Khana Radio in Banjarmasin, South Kalimantan
 Batara FM in Bandar Lampung, Lampung Province

Kenya
 98.4 Capital FM in Mombasa and Nairobi

Malaysia
 Melody in Johor Bahru, Johor and Singapore
 TraXX FM in Gerik, Perak

New Zealand
 The Sound in Nelson

Zimbabwe
 98.4 Midlands in Gweru

References

Lists of radio stations by frequency